Thalassodrilides is a genus of annelids belonging to the family Naididae.

The genus has almost cosmopolitan distribution.

Species:

Thalassodrilides belli 
Thalassodrilides briani 
Thalassodrilides bruneti 
Thalassodrilides gurwitschi 
Thalassodrilides ineri 
Thalassodrilides milleri 
Thalassodrilides pectinatus 
Thalassodrilides roseus

References

Naididae
Annelid genera